The Benjamin Morton House, also known as the Morton-Bush House, is a historic brick home located at 4084 Kingston Pike in Knoxville, Tennessee, United States.

It was constructed in 1927, and designed in the Colonial Revival style by the noted Knoxville architectural firm, Baumann and Baumann.  The residence carries the name of its early occupant, Benjamin Morton (1875–1952).  Morton was the president of the wholesale grocer, H. T. Hackney Company, and served as Knoxville's mayor from 1924 until 1927.

The Benjamin Morton House was listed on the National Register of Historic Places in 2004. Its grounds include extensive gardens.

References

Houses completed in 1927
Houses on the National Register of Historic Places in Tennessee
Houses in Knoxville, Tennessee
National Register of Historic Places in Knoxville, Tennessee